The Surprise Saguaros are a baseball team that plays in the West Division of the Arizona Fall League. They play their home games in Surprise, Arizona, at Surprise Stadium. The ballpark is also the spring training facility of the Kansas City Royals and Texas Rangers. The team was established in 1992 as the Phoenix Saguaros, and has retained its nickname through multiple location changes. The team has won three league championships, most recently in 2022.

Roster

MLB alumni

Yonder Alonso 
Bryan Anderson 
Tim Beckham 
Mookie Betts 
Bradley Boxberger 
Jason Castro 
Alex Cobb 
Zack Cozart 
Delino DeShields 
Matt Dominguez 
Eduardo Escobar 
Freddie Freeman 
Brandon Gomes 
Chris Heisey 
Brandon Hicks 
Jason Heyward 
Cedric Hunter 
Craig Kimbrel 
Ian Kinsler 
Mike Leake 
Wilton López 
Jerry Manuel 
Leonys Martín 
Bob Melvin 
Devin Mesoraco 
Justin Miller 
Mike Minor 
Wil Myers 
Mike Olt 
Logan Ondrusek 
Chris Parmelee 
Tony Peña 
Vinnie Pestano 
Aaron Poreda 
Zach Putnam 
Jimmy Rollins 
Daryl Thompson 
Christian Vázquez 
Kolten Wong

See also
 Arizona Fall League#Results by season

References

External links

Batting and pitching statistics (2005–present)

Arizona Fall League teams
Professional baseball teams in Arizona
1992 establishments in Arizona
Baseball teams established in 1992
Sports in Surprise, Arizona